Somethin's Burnin is an album by jazz guitarist Peter Bernstein that was released by Criss Cross Jazz in 1994.

Track listing

Personnel
 Peter Bernstein – guitar
 Brad Mehldau – piano
 John Webber – double bass
 Jimmy Cobb – drums

References

1994 albums
Peter Bernstein albums
Criss Cross Jazz albums